Anẹ Igáláà (Igala Land) also known as the   Igala Kingdom. Igala Kingdom is a pre-colonial West African state, located at the eastern region of the confluence of River Niger and River Benue in the Middle Belt or North-central of Nigeria. The kingdom was founded by the Igala people, with the "Àtá" Serving as the Igala   Emperor, national father and spiritual head, and the capital Of  Igala land is at  Idah.  The Igala Kingdom influenced and has been influenced by the Yoruba, Idoma, Igbo and Jukun, and is likely made up of descendants of these groups who settled and mixed with the native Igala populations.

IGALA LINGUISTICS

Àbó Igáláà = people.

ÌCHÒLÒ/ÙCHÒLÒ= Culture  

íchí  Igáláà =Igala language

The etymology of the term "Igala" itself  may be derived from "Iga" which means a partition, blockade, a dividing wall, and "Ala" which means "sheep". Iga-ala thus became Igala. The reason for this form of self identification is currently debated by scholars. However, a possible theory designates the citizens of the kingdom as the sheep, and the state being the wall or defence that protects them.

Religion
The Igala traditional concept of God is a belief in the Supreme Being whom they call Ọjọ. Ọjọ is held so supreme, that out of his supremacy he gave powers and authorities to the gods and spirits over the different spheres of human life. These gods and spirits have practical dealings with human beings in their everyday life activities. Ifa,  is the traditional belief of the Igalas and is still practiced by many. This system of worship is predicated on a belief in, and honoring of ancestral spirits. Many communities, families, and individuals maintain shrines for the worship of deities and spirits. The traditional worship is known as " Icheboeche" while the worshippers are known as "Amachichebo" are called Custodians serve as medicinal practitioners, and are versed in oral traditional history and the use of herbs and plants to cure ailments.

Igalas regard God or   Ọjọ́-chàmáchālāà  as all knowing and all seeing a similar worldview to that of  the Abrahamic faiths that originate in the middle east which have now started to eclipse traditional faiths.

However, to access this God and also, to ascertain what He is saying per time, Ifa needs to be consulted. The Ifa is like the Urim and Thurim in Judaism. With it, the mindset of God can be made known on any given matter.

To this end, all the demigods especially the natural elements of water and land are given sacrificial offerings periodically. This is done to gain their favour.

Another aspect of Faith amongst the Igalas is the Ibegwu, Ibo (people) egwu (dead). The spirits of the departed souls plays an important role in the various clans. It is believed that they see everything and knows everything, hence, they are good in arbitration. The Ibegwu judges the actions of the living, especially in cases of land disputes, infidelity, family disputes and general conducts regarding sex and sexuality (Ibegwu forbids sex in day time, oral sex, brothers sharing same sex partners, etc). However, Ibegwu is only potent on individuals whose families are connected to it. Families that have no ties with Ibegwu do not usually feel their impact. When Ibegwu judges a person of wrong doing, the consequence is the manifestation of diseases that defies medical solution.

Political structure
The Àtá's court is known as the Ogbede which is a building that that Àtá holds court within with its head being known as the Ogbe or president of court. The Amedibo are the royal servants and the Amonoji are Àtá's eunuchs. The symbols of power are the royal objects, including the oka (beads), okwu (neck-lace), robe (olawoni), red-cap (olumada), and otihi (flywhisk).). Other sacred objects are the Ejubejuailo (The Ata's pectoral Mask), Onunu-Ere (royal crown), Unyiale Ata (royal umbrella),  Odechi / Okakachi (royal band), Oka kpai Okwu (royal beads) and the  Akpa-Ayegba (the stool).

The Àtá himself or herself is in-charge of the major sacred objects, shrines and festivals of the Igala people.

The Ach'adu serves as the Chief executive. Another title associated with this post is Oko-Ata (Ata's traditional husband. Ach'adu itself means prime minister)

District Officers (onu) and
provincial chiefs (Am'onu) were also in custody of their various shrines, grooves, sacred objects and festivals in their own domains. The hierarchy included District-heads (Am'onu-ane), clan heads (Gago), village heads (Omadachi) and youth leaders (Achiokolobia).

Among the Igalas, the titles of Ata and Achadu are held by only two people at the same time, while the titles of Onu, Achema, Akoji, Makoji, Eje, Onoja are used by multiple people at once. These titles may also be used as names. In many cases, these titles largely relate to occupations. For example, Gago which is clan leader, or Onoja being the head of the market. Names which are used as titles, such as Akoji and Makoji (which signify being a representative or substitute for the Ata) are given in hopes that the child would grow to attain such a lofty title.  A strictly merit-based system is employed when giving out such titles.

Ígáláà Subdivisions
Anẹ Ígáláà has nine traditional ruling councils, including the capital Idah. The nine councils each has a King (onu) who is appointed by religious rite through a complex system of traditional rite and proceedings supervised by the head of the council, the Àtá Ígáláà in Idah.
The seven Ígáláà councils are:
Ankpa,
Ajaka,
Ugwolawo,
Egume,
Dekina,
Omalla,
and Olamaboro Anyigba. Historically, each council had varying degrees of traditional administration which was based on tax collection from land holders, fishermen and market traders.

Àtá
The first Àtá, the title given to the ruler of the kingdom, was Ebulejonu, a woman; she was succeeded by her brother Aganapoje, the father of Idoko. Idoko would later succeed him as Ata, and had two children Atiyele and Ayegba om'Idoko (Ayegba son of Idoko), Atiyele the first son of Idoko migrated eastward of the kingdom to establish Ankpa kingdom while Ayegba the second son of Idoko succeeded his father as Ata'IGala. He led a war against the Jukun, which resulted in victory. HRH Idakwo Micheal was appointed as the new Ata of Igala in December 2012. The position of Ata Igala rotates among four branches of the royal clan. The Igala kingdom was founded by Abutu-Eje in the 16th century. The kingdom was ruled by nine high officials called the Igala Mela who are custodians of the sacred Earth shrine. The Throne of the Ata is currently rotated among the clans of Aju Akogwu, Aju Amẹchọ, Aju Akwu, Aju Ocholi. "Aju" is meant to signify who the clan came from, as being the name of the ancestor of the clan.

List of Àtá 

 ÀJI ÀTÁ DYNASTY 

 Aji-Ata (1507-1537)
Olema I (1537-1567)
 Anogena (1567-1597)
 Agbo (1597-1627)
 Agọchi (1627-1657)
Olema II (1657-1687)  
Kwararafa Dynasty 
Abutu Ẹjẹ
Ata who ruled in the Independence Era 
Ebulẹjonu  Ọm Abutu (f)
Aganapoje  Ọm Abutu
 Idoko  Ọm Aganapoje
Ayẹgba  Ọm Idoko
Akwumabi  Ọm Ayẹgba (Onu) (Onakpa)
Akogwu  Ọm Ayẹgba
 Ocholi Ọgakọ Ọm Ayẹgba (Ohiemi Ọbọgọ )
 Agada Elame Ọm Ayẹgba
 Amẹh Achọ  Ọm Akwumabi
 Itodo Aduga  Ọm Akwumabi
 Ọgala  Ọm Akogwu
 Idoko Adegbe Ọm Ocholi
 Onuchẹ Ọm Amẹh Achọ
 1835  Ẹkẹlẹ Aga  Ọm Ọgala
 1835–1856  Amẹh Ocheje  Ọm Itodo
 1856–1870  Akwu Odiba  Ọm Idoko
 1870–1876  Okolíko  Ọm Onuchẹ
 1876–1900  Amẹh Agah  Ọm Ẹkẹlẹ Agah

Ata who ruled during British occupation

 1900–1903  Ocheje Amẹh Ocheje   Ọm Amẹh Ocheje (aka Ocheje Nokwa)
 1905–1911 Amẹh Oboni Akwu  Ọm Odoba
 1911–1919  Ogwuchẹ Akpah Ọm Okoliko
 1919–1926  Atabọ Ijọmi  Ọm Amaga
 1926–1945   Ọbaje  Ọm Ocheje
 1945 – 23 June 1956 Amẹh Oboni   Akpoli Ọm Oboní

Ata who ruled from Nigerian Independence till date

 20 October 1956 – 16 July 2012: Aliyu Ocheje Ọm Otulikpe Ọbaje  - was installed by the British shortly before independence
 10 March 2013 – 27 August 2020:  Idakwo Ọm Amẹh Ọm Oboni
2021–present   Ọpaluwa Ọm Ọpaluwa Ogwuchẹ Akpah

See also
Igala people
Idah

References

Further reading

Ajodo, Saidu (2006). A Short History of Omoja Clan in the Igala Kingdom. El-Deen Printers. .
Boston, J. S.; Research, Nigerian Institute of Social and Economic (1968). The Igala Kingdom. Nigerian Institute of Social and Economic Research. .

Former countries in Africa
Nigerian traditional states